Wizard of Odds may refer to:
 Michael Shackleford (born 1965), expert on the math behind casino games
 Donald Angelini (1926–2000), Chicago gambling mobster
 The Wizard of Odds, a 1973 television game show starring Alex Trebek